Bjørvika is a tram stop in the Oslo Tramway. It is one of the stops on the Bjørvika Line and is served by lines 13 and 19. It is located in Sentrum, Oslo. Bjørvika is nearby the bus station called Bjørvika, and it served by multiple local and regional bus routes. Bjørvika is near Deichmann's public library, the Opera House and the Barcode promade.

History 
It was a terminus in 2017 and 2018 for lines 17 and 18, due to building repairs. It also served as a terminus for line 13 (from May 18, 2020 to September 11, 2020), due to repairs on the Grünerløkka-Torshov Line. It was opened for daily use on October 4, 2020.

References

Oslo Tramway
Oslo Tramway stations